The World Unseen is a 2008 novel written by Shamim Sarif.

The movie with the same title made its debut before, more specifically in 2007 at the Toronto International Film Festival, and its script was actually used in order to add the final touches to the novel. The film featured Sheetal Sheth and Lisa Ray as the protagonists.
The actresses have collaborated with the award-winning author for another motion picture, an adaptation of Shamim's novel I Can't Think Straight.

Plot summary
In 1950’s South Africa, free-spirited Amina has broken all the rules of her own conventional Indian community, and the new apartheid-led government, by running a cafe with Jacob her “coloured” business partner. When she meets Miriam, a young wife and mother, their unexpected attraction pushes Miriam to question the rules that bind her. When Amina helps Miriam’s sister-in-law to hide from the police, a chain of events is set in motion that changes both women forever.

The World Unseen transports us to a vibrant, colourful world, a world that divides white from black and women from men, but one that might just allow an unexpected love to survive.

References

 
 
 
 
 
 
 
 
 
 
 
 
 
 6TH PRODUCERS LAB TORONTO JUST KICKED OFF

External links
'The World Unseen' book official website
 
'The World Unseen' official UK trailer
'The World Unseen' official US trailer
'The World Unseen' SAFTA Awards with Shamim Sarif and Hanan Kattan
'The World Unseen' Exclusive interview with Shamim Sarif and Sheetal Sheth

2008 novels
Novels set in South Africa
British novels adapted into films
Novels based on films
Novels about racism